Modern Continental was a construction company based in Cambridge, Massachusetts that was involved in the Boston "Big Dig" Central Artery/Tunnel Project. On June 23, 2008, the company filed for Chapter 11 bankruptcy in federal court in Boston.

History
Modern Continental Construction was a heavy-construction company and the original business in the Modern Continental group.  Modern was one of the major contractors on the Central Artery/Tunnel Project, the largest single public works project in United States history.  Modern was founded in 1967 by Kenneth Anderson and Italian immigrant Les Marino.  On September 23, 2004, Marino announced plans to merge Modern Continental Construction and a subdivision of Jay Cashman, Inc.

Modern Continental Enterprises was a division of the company that built housing developments, built and managed office buildings, operated marinas, operated charter and tendered bus and ferry services, owned and operated an organic produce farm in Natick, Massachusetts, and operated an Italian restaurant in Cambridge, Massachusetts.

Criticism
During 2004, Modern Continental Construction endured mounting criticism for its failure to complete multiple projects on schedule, including a major highway-widening project in northeastern Massachusetts and a major drinking-water pipeline in the San Francisco Bay Area, and questions were raised about its financial stability.  The East Bay Municipal Utility District terminated a $24.5 million contract with Modern in early 2004 due to Modern's failure to meet construction schedules, insufficient staffing and oversight, and numerous pipe defects that Modern was unable to correct. East Bay Municipal Utility District reversed the termination for cause to a termination for convenience. Had Modern been able to complete the project and carefully excavate around the pipeline as opposed to the method East Bay Municipal Utility District allowed the follow-on contractor Mountain Cascade to perform, those five souls may still be alive today. Modern was also briefly dropped from Massachusetts' list of highway contractors qualified to bid on state-funded projects.  Later that year, questions were raised about the workmanship on a Central Artery contract, for which Modern was the lead contractor, after a large leak was found in the Interstate 93 tunnel beneath downtown Boston which led to the disclosure and discovery of "thousands of leaks."

Ceiling collapse
On July 10, 2006, four three-ton concrete ceiling panels on Interstate 90 in South Boston, Massachusetts fell onto a car driven by Boston resident Angel Del Valle, injuring him and killing his wife Milena.  The ceiling panel collapse has been attributed to the failure of bolts anchored into the structure with an epoxy adhesive from which the panels are hung. Modern Continental built that section of the highway in 1999.  (See Big Dig for more details.)  The investigation continues.

Investigation

During the period after the ceiling panel collapse a memo allegedly written in 1999 by John J. Keaveney, a former Modern Continental employee to his Project Manager warning of the potential for failure of the hanger system was sent to the Boston Globe.  Keaveney recently said that he sent it to the Globe with a current Modern Continental employee's name and office address on the envelope because he feared the consequences if it were known that he provided the newspaper with the memo. "I was worried about the repercussions and that it might affect my family and my livelihood," Keaveney said.

Bankruptcy
On June 23, 2008, Modern Continental filed for Chapter 11 bankruptcy in federal court in Boston.

Notes

References

External links
Company Web site

Companies based in Cambridge, Massachusetts
Companies that filed for Chapter 11 bankruptcy in 2008